The Cancer Support Community (CSC) focuses on three areas of support: direct service delivery, research, and advocacy.

The organization includes an international network of Affiliates that offer social and emotional support for people impacted by cancer, as well as a community of support available online and over the phone. Its Research and Training Institute conducts psychosocial, behavioral and survivorship research. CSC furthers its focus on patient advocacy through the Cancer Policy Institute, informing public policy in Washington D.C. and across the nation.

Individual gifts, corporate and foundation contributions, and educational grants are the major sources of support for CSC.

History
The Cancer Support Community formed in 2009 following the merger of The Wellness Community and Gilda's Club The Wellness Community was founded in 1982 by Harold and Harriet Benjamin with Shannon McGowan in California. They wanted to create something that had previously been missing in cancer care—an organization that would provide social and emotional support to cancer patients, their families, friends and caregivers. Gilda's Club was founded in 1991 in honor of Saturday Night Live comedian and former ovarian cancer patient, Gilda Radner, after her passing, by her husband, Gene Wilder, and Joanna Bull with other friends and family. Gilda's Club opened locations to provide social and emotional support for people living with cancer nationwide while the Wellness Community locations remained on the West Coast.

In 2007 the Institute of Medicine released a pivotal report on the importance of addressing the social and emotional needs of individuals living with cancer, which was a practice both the Wellness Community and Gilda's Club had been implementing for years. Not long after, to be able to better serve more individuals living with cancer, the Wellness Community and Gilda's Club merged to become the Cancer Support Community.

Programs and services

Support 
CSC provides a toll-free Cancer Support Helpline which takes calls from patients, families and health professionals seeking information, access to local and national resources, and counseling.  An online chat service is also part of the support services.  CSC also hosts an online support group called the Living Room.  The community includes message boards and professional facilitated online support groups.

Affiliate Network
The Cancer Support Affiliate Network consists of 42 licensed affiliates, 150 satellite locations and a growing number of health care partnerships. Affiliates provide programs free of charge to anyone affected by cancer, including patients, survivors, caregivers, loved ones and children. These programs include support groups, short-term individual counseling, social activities, resource and referral services, educational sessions and health and wellness programs.

Educational resources
CSC produces the Frankly Speaking About Cancer program series in several formats to meet the educational needs of patients and families.  The series includes eBooks, print material, videos, webinars and a podcast.

Online support
The Living Room is CSC's online support group in the form of message boards and support groups.  People impacted by cancer can join, post to the message boards, or find a support group.

Research
The Cancer Support Community established the Research and Training Institute (RTI) to conduct psychosocial, behavioral and survivorship research for people living with cancer. The goal of the research is to provide improved resources to individuals touched by cancer.

The Cancer Support Community uses evidence-based interventions to improve the patient experience by adding to the body of psychosocial research, developing tools and education resources.
    
Among their key research programs and services are:

CSC's Cancer Experience Registry is an online community that enables people impacted by cancer to share their experiences, identify issues that impact their lives, take surveys, and access resources.  CSC's RTI group uses the information from the surveys filled out by participants to improve the care for people with cancer and their caregivers, and to develop better services and programs for the community.
CSC offers a decision support counseling program called Open to Options that can help patients prepare for an appointment in which they will be making a treatment decision.
CancerSupportSource is a distress screening, referral and follow-up program developed and implemented by CSC. It was created to identify the specific concerns experienced by a patient and provide a tailored and desired response.

Policy and advocacy
The Cancer Policy Institute at the Cancer Support Community works with advisors and friends to advocate the mandate that comprehensive, quality cancer care includes medical care, as well as social and emotional care. The Cancer Policy Institute has initiatives, training opportunities, learning materials, and events.  
CSC's Grassroots Advocacy Network is open to anyone to join. The network provides a place to learn more about key issues that are important to cancer patients and their loved ones, and make one's voice heard at a local and national level.  CSC positions include: access to care for all patients, quality as a central theme, and research as a critical priority.

Use of funds
In 2015, the Cancer Support Community reported $8,731,796 net assets at the end of the year.  In the same year, CSC reported $5,981,094 on expenses.  Of those expenses, 82% went to programs and services, 9% went to management and general, and the other 9% went to general fundraising.

Evaluations and ratings
The Cancer Support Community has received numerous high-level charity ratings including the following: 
	
The GuideStar Exchange Gold Participant distinction
Charity Navigator 4-star rating
The Independent Charities Seal of Excellence
Named a Top Nonprofit Organization by Philanthropedia

References

External links
 Cancer Support Community: http://www.cancersupportcommunity.org
 Cancer Experience Registry: http://www.cancerexperienceregistry.org

Cancer organizations based in the United States